At the Potter's Wheel is a 1914 American silent short drama film directed by Lorimer Johnston. The film stars Charlotte Burton, Sydney Ayres, Caroline Cooke, Louise Lester, Jack Richardson and Vivian Rich.

External links

1914 films
1914 drama films
Silent American drama films
American silent short films
American black-and-white films
1914 short films
Films directed by Lorimer Johnston
1910s American films
1910s English-language films
American drama short films